Mardyan is a district situated in the central eastern part of the Jowzjan Province, Afghanistan. It borders Mingajik District to the west, Qarqin District to north, Balkh Province and Fayzabad District to the east and Aqcha District to the south. The population is 34,200 (2006). The district center is the village of Mardyan, located in the central part of the district.

District Map 
AIMS District Map

Districts of Jowzjan Province